Choe U (1166 - 10 December 1249) was the second Choe dictator of the Ubong Choe Military regime. He himself went out on the battlefield to lead in fighting off the Mongolian invasions. Then he realized that the government was no longer safe at the capital city of Kaesong, and so he forced the king and his officials to flee to Ganghwa island. He took some of his armies and went to Ganghwa island with them. He did this because he knew that the Mongols would not attempt a naval assault against Ganghwa. Therefore, the Goryeo government was kept safe for several decades even after the Choe regime.

Background
Choe U was the son of the Goryeo Dynasty military regime's founder, Choe Chung-Heon (최충헌,崔忠獻), and grandson of the Grand General Choe Won-Ho  (최원호,崔元浩). Choe U's birthdate is unknown, but it is known that the Choe family lived in the capital of Kaesong at the time when Choe Chung-Heon assassinated Yi Ui-Min. Choe U was around the age of seventeen when his father assassinated the tyrant Yi in 1196, and saw how his father amassed and wielded power. Choe U was said to have been a skilled general and fighter as well as an exceptional statesman.

Early life
He joined the Imperial army at the age of eighteen and served for about twenty years, and continued to serve while he was dictator. Not much is known about Choe U's early life. There was the incident of succeeding his father. When the time came for Choe Chung-Heon to select a successor, he had two choices. He selected U because he was the first son, and he was the more talented and capable of the two.  U's brother, Hyang, did not take this lightly and so the two brothers faced each other in a sword duel, and it ended in U's victory. U did not kill his brother, but put his fate in his father's hands. Choe Chung-Heon announced that U would be his successor, and U became the Royal protector/prime minister, and leader of the Imperial Council.

Dictator
Choe U controlled the Goryeo government with King Gojong as his puppet. He was able to preserve the Goryeo empire by hiding the government on Ganghwa island. At the same time, Choe U did a better of appeasing the people than his father had done. He returned all of the treasures and that his father had taken and distributed it to the people. With this, the people of Goryeo became more willing to live under a dictatorship. Choe U's rule was mostly composed of Mongolian Invasions. He directly led Goryeo forces to fight off the first Mongol Invasion.

Death and succession
Choe U died suddenly of disease after the Fourth Mongol invasion of Goryeo (July 1247 – March 1248), and was succeeded by his son Choe Hang.

Family
Father: Choi Chung-heon (1149 - 29 October 1219) (최충헌)
Grandfather: Choi Won-ho (최원호)
Grandmother: Lady Yu (부인 유씨)
Mother: Lady Song (부인 송씨)
Grandfather: Song Cheong (송청)
Wives and their issue(s):
Lady, of the Hadong Jeong clan (? - 1231) (부인 하동 정씨); daughter of Jeong Suk-cheom (정숙첨).
Lady Choe Song-yi (최송이); married Gim Yak-seon (김약선).
Grandson: Gim Mi (김미)
Grandson: Gim Wi-hang (김위항)
Grandson: Gim Pil-yeong (김필영)
Great-granddaughter: Queen Jeongsun (정순왕후, 1222 - 29 July 1237)
Lady Choe (부인 최씨)
Lady, of the Hyeopgye Dae clan (? - 1251) (부인 협계 대씨); daughter of Dae Jip-seong (대집성 , d. 1236).
Oh Seung-jeok (오승적) – stepson, died after killed by Choe Hang.
Lady, of the Cheorwon Choe clan (부인 철원 최씨)
Lady Seo Ryeon-bang (서련방) – a prostitute.
Choe Man-jong (최만종)
Choe Hang (1209 – 17 May 1257) (최항)
Lady An Sim (안심)

See also
History of Korea
List of Goryeo people

Notes

Korean generals
1249 deaths
Choe clan of Ubong
1166 births
Regents of Korea
Goryeo writers
12th-century Korean calligraphers
13th-century Korean calligraphers